Michal Horváth (born 30 June 1987 in Prague) is a Czech rower. He finished 5th in the men's coxless four at the 2008 Summer Olympics and 13th in the same event at the 2012 Summer Olympics.

References 
 
 

1987 births
Living people
Czech male rowers
Rowers from Prague
Olympic rowers of the Czech Republic
Rowers at the 2008 Summer Olympics
Rowers at the 2012 Summer Olympics
European Rowing Championships medalists